Top seeds Mariusz Fyrstenberg and Santiago González won the title, beating Maverick Banes and Jarryd Chaplin 7–6(7–3), 6–3

Seeds

Draw

References
 Main Draw

2016 ATP Challenger Tour
2016 in Australian tennis